Bamike Olawunmi, popularly known as Bambam is a Nigerian reality TV star and an actress. She is the wife of a singer and actor, Tope Adenibuyan. She is known for her roles in Inspector K, Backup Wife and Foreigner's God.

Early life and education 
Bambam was the eldest in the family of a retired nurse and a diplomat. She has lived alongside her father in the United States, France and United Kingdom in the course of his job. Bambam obtained her primary school certificate from Nigerian Navy Primary School, Apapa. She obtained her post-elementary certificate from La Folie St. James, Paris, France, and her first degree from The Bells University, Ota.

Acting career 
Bambam started her acting career in 2017 when she was still a student of the Royal Arts Academy. Since then she had featured in quite number of movies including Inspector K’, ‘Backup Wife and Foreigner's God.

Big Brother Naija 
Bambam was picked after her second trial at the Big Brother Naija TV reality show audition. In 2017, she did the first audition at Abuja and the second one that took her to Big Brother Naija house was done in Lagos in 2018.

Personal life 
Bambam married Tope Adenibuyan, her roommate in the Big Brother Naija house. Their traditional wedding took place on 7 September 2019 in Ogun state while the white wedding took place in Dubai, UAE on 16 November 2019. Bambam and her husband have two children.

References 

Living people
Yoruba actresses
21st-century Nigerian actresses
Year of birth missing (living people)
Participants in Nigerian reality television series
Nigerian film actresses